Myiopsitta is a genus of parrot in the family Psittacidae. They are native to South America, but are found all over Europe, as well. They are known as an invasive species due to the crop damage they cause, which greatly affects the wildlife all across Europe. The monk parakeet is sometimes considered monotypic within the genus.

The genus was introduced by French naturalist Charles Lucien Bonaparte in 1854. The type species was subsequent designated as the monk parakeet (Myiopsitta monachus) by English zoologist George Robert Gray in 1855. The genus name combines the Ancient Greek mus, muos meaning "mouse" and the New Latin psitta meaning "parrot". The name alludes to the mouse-grey face and underparts of the monk parakeet.

Species
The genus contains two species:

References

 
Bird genera
Taxa named by Charles Lucien Bonaparte